Grammar school Milena Pavlović Barilli is a grammar school in the municipality of Stari Grad, Belgrade, Serbia. It is accredited by the Ministry of Education, Science and Technological Development. It is named for painter and poet Milena Pavlović-Barili.

Since 2008 the school has been developing the idea of bilingual education.

About the school 
Milena Pavlović Barilli implements the program of general secondary schools provided by the curriculum of the Ministry of Education, but with an individual approach to each student that encourages gaining wide grammar school knowledge. The school allows attending individual lessons adapted to students’ schedules of training sessions and other commitments for all students who are simultaneously engaged in a sport and the school, and who, because of their obligations cannot attend regular classes. The school allows attending individual lessons adapted to students' schedules, training sessions and other commitments. Milena Pavlović Barilli offers scholarships to the best talented elementary school students every year. The school has a long tradition cherished by 2008. Since then seven generations of students have come out as graduates of the school and there are many successful students and brilliant business people among them.

References

External links 
  

Grammar schools
Schools in Belgrade